The Chongqing–Kunming high-speed railway is a high-speed railway line currently under construction in China. The line, which runs from Chongqing West to Kunming South, will be part of the Beijing–Kunming corridor.

Journey times from Kunming to Chengdu and Chongqing are expected to be around two hours.

Part of the line is the Yiliang tunnel, on the border of Yiliang County and Yanjin County, which would become the longest high-speed railway tunnel built for to a  standard.

History
Construction on the Sichuan section began on 29 September 2019. Construction on the Yunnan section began on 20 December 2019.

Notes

References

High-speed railway lines in China
High-speed railway lines under construction

25 kV AC railway electrification